Dannatt is a surname. Notable people with the surname include:

Adrian Dannatt, artist, art critic and journalist
Andy Dannatt, British rugby league player
Richard Dannatt, British Army general and former chief of the General Staff

See also
Dannatt plates, thick sheets made of electrical conductors, usually copper, positioned around an AC magnetic circuit to help guide magnetic flux
Dannatt's tiger, a species of butterfly